The Toronto Varsity Blues is the intercollegiate sports program at the University of Toronto. Its 43 athletic teams regularly participate in competitions held by Ontario University Athletics and U Sports.  The Varsity Blues traces its founding to 1877, with the formation of the men's football team. Since 1908, Varsity Blues athletes have won numerous medals in Olympic Games and Paralympic Games and have also long competed in International University Sports Federation championships, Commonwealth Games, and Pan American Games.

The Varsity Blues program has teams in badminton, baseball, basketball, cross country running, curling, fastpitch softball, fencing, field hockey, figure skating, football, golf, ice hockey, lacrosse, mountain biking, nordic skiing, rowing, rugby, soccer, squash, swimming, tennis, track and field, volleyball, water polo and wrestling.

Men's ice hockey

The men's ice hockey team plays in the Ontario University Athletics conference, and are coached by Ryan Medel. The team is based at Varsity Arena. The current Varsity Blues have won ten U Sports Championships. The men's ice hockey team was founded in 1891. The Varsity Blues senior team won the Allan Cup in 1921 and 1927, and won the gold medal at the 1928 Winter Olympics. Conn Smythe (U of T 1920), the principal owner of the NHL Toronto Maple Leafs (1927–61) and builder of Maple Leaf Gardens (1931), chose Royal Blue and White as his team's colours to honour his alma mater. The Maple Leafs are popularly known as "The Blue & White" by many of their older fans.

Men's soccer

Women's ice hockey

Women's track & field
Middle and long distance runner Sasha Gollish was named 2015 Canadian Interuniversity Sport (CIS) Female Athlete of the Year (track events) for her performance at the CIS Championships, winning three gold medals in the 1000m, 3000m, and 4 × 800 m relay events and two silver medals in the 600m and 1500m events, the most individual medals ever won by a distance athlete. She was also named MVP of the 2015 Ontario University Athletics (OUA) Championships after winning three individual gold medals in the 600m, 1500m, and 3000m events. In November 2015 she was named one of the Top 8 Academic All-Canadians by Canadian Interuniversity Sport.

Football

Nordic skiing
The Nordic skiing team competes against Ontario universities each year at the OUA Championships in February after qualifying races earlier in the season. The team has steadily grown in size and experience since Hans Fischer stepped up to the position of coach in the 2005-06 season.

Rowing
The University of Toronto Rowing Club represents the Varsity Blues at local and international regattas.  The UTRC was founded on February 10, 1897, and throughout the years has had many successes including Royal Canadian Henley Regatta victories, OUA titles, and a silver medal at the 1924 Summer Olympics in Paris.

Volleyball
The volleyball team has been coached by, among others, Olympian Sam Schachter.

Awards and honours
Kylie Masse: U Sports Female Athlete of the Month - February 2018

Lieutenant Governor Athletic Awards
2016: Kylie Masse (Swimming) 
2002: Elizabeth Warden (Swimming) 
1998: Foy Williams (Track & Field)
1996: Justine Ellison (Basketball)

Athletes of the year

See also
 List of University of Toronto people

References

External links

 

 
U Sports teams
University of Toronto
Sports teams in Toronto